Raja Rammohun Roy National Agency for ISBN is an Indian government agency which is the only ISBN agency which run under Ministry of Education, Government of India. It was founded in January 1985 to facilitate authors and publishers to register for ISBN in India. It gives free ISBN to Indian citizens.

References 

Government agencies of India
ISBN agencies